Aklavik Water Aerodrome  is located adjacent to Aklavik, Northwest Territories, Canada on the Peel Channel of the Mackenzie River delta.

Aklavik was the regional centre but was prone to flooding. In 1959, Inuvik was purpose built to house a larger airport, highway connections, new health facilities, housing and an innovative public utilidor system. Aklavik remains a small traditional village that retains its connections to the land and river. The river is open from the middle of June until September.

See also 
Aklavik/Freddie Carmichael Airport

References

Airports in the Arctic
Registered aerodromes in the Inuvik Region
Seaplane bases in the Northwest Territories